The 2010 Purbeck District Council election took place on 6 May 2010 to elect members of Purbeck District Council in Dorset, England. One third of the council was up for election and the council stayed under no overall control.

After the election, the composition of the council was
Liberal Democrat 12
Conservative 10
Independent 2

Background
Purbeck was one of only four councils in the 2010 local elections to have a candidate elected without opposition, with an Independent candidate being returned unopposed.

Election result
The results saw the Liberal Democrats gain one seat from the Conservatives to hold exactly half of the seats on the council.  With the election having taken place at the same time as the 2010 general election. Overall turnout in the election was over 72%.

Ward results

References

2010
2010 English local elections
May 2010 events in the United Kingdom
2010s in Dorset